The 1980 Hardy Cup was the 1980 edition of the Canadian intermediate senior ice hockey championship.

Final
Best of 5
Burnaby 6 Fredericton 5
Burnaby 7 Fredericton 5
Burnaby 4 Fredericton 1
Burnaby Lakers beat Fredericton Capitals 3-0 on series.

External links
Hockey Canada

Hardy Cup
Hardy